The 1964 Buffalo Bills season was the team’s fifth season. Buffalo was 12–2 in the regular season and won the first of two consecutive championships in the American Football League.

The 1964 Bills' defense set an AFL record by giving up the fewest rushing yards in league history, with only 918, or 65.5 yards per game. They also led the league in points allowed (242), total yards allowed (3,878), first downs surrendered (206), and rushing touchdowns allowed (four).

Buffalo's offense also led the AFL in total yards (5,206), passing yards (2,040) and total points (400).

Offseason

AFL Draft

Personnel

Staff

Roster

Regular season

Season schedule

Note: Intra-division opponents are in bold text.

Game summaries

Week 1

Week 2

Week 3

Week 4

Week 5

    
    
    
    
    
    
    
    
    
    
    

Jack Kemp 14/26, 378 Yds
Elbert Dubenion 5 Rec, 183 Yds
Glenn Bass 5 Rec, 147 Yds

Standings

Postseason

AFL Championship Game

Player stats

Passing

Rushing

Special teams

Kicking

Punting

Awards and Records
Lou Saban, Coach of the Year

See also
 List of American Football League players

References

Buffalo Bills on Pro Football Reference
Buffalo Bills on jt-sw.com
1964 AFL Champions

Buffalo Bills
American Football League championship seasons
Buffalo Bills seasons
1964 in sports in New York (state)